PORC may refer to:

 Postoperative residual curarization
 Porcelain
 Porcupine, see also Porcupine (disambiguation)

See also
 Pork (disambiguation)